Route 93 or Highway 93 can refer to:

International
 European route E93

Australia 
 - Victoria

Canada
 Alberta Highway 93
 British Columbia Highway 93
 Newfoundland and Labrador Route 93
 Ontario Highway 93

China
  G93 Chengyu Ring Expressway

Germany
Bundesautobahn 93

India
 National Highway 93

Iran
 Road 93

Korea, South
National Route 93

Mexico
 Mexican Federal Highway 93

New Zealand
  New Zealand State Highway 93

United States
 Interstate 93
 U.S. Route 93
 U.S. Route 93A
 Alabama State Route 93
 Arizona State Route 93 (former)
 Arkansas Highway 93
 California State Route 93 (unsigned)
 Colorado State Highway 93
  Connecticut Route 93 (former)
 Florida State Road 93
 Florida State Road 93A
 Georgia State Route 93
 Hawaii Route 93
 Illinois Route 93
 Iowa Highway 93
 Kentucky Route 93
 Louisiana Highway 93
 Louisiana State Route 93 (former)
 Maine State Route 93
 Maryland Route 93 (former)
 Massachusetts Route 93 (former)
 M-93 (Michigan highway)
 Minnesota State Highway 93
 Nebraska Highway 93 (1934–1947) (former)
 Nebraska Highway 93 (1947–1957) (former)
 Nebraska Link 93B
 Nebraska Link 93E
 Nebraska Spur 93A
 Nebraska Spur 93C
 Nebraska Spur 93D
 Nebraska Spur 93F
 Nevada State Route 93 (1960s) (former)
 New Jersey Route 93
 County Route 93 (Bergen County, New Jersey)
 New Mexico State Road 93
 New York State Route 93
 County Route 93 (Chautauqua County, New York)
 County Route 93 (Dutchess County, New York)
 County Route 93 (Erie County, New York)
 County Route 93 (Madison County, New York)
 County Route 93 (Niagara County, New York)
 County Route 93 (Orange County, New York)
 County Route 93 (Rockland County, New York)
 County Route 93 (Steuben County, New York)
 County Route 93 (Suffolk County, New York)
 North Carolina Highway 93
 Ohio State Route 93
 Oklahoma State Highway 93
 Pennsylvania Route 93
 South Carolina Highway 93
 Tennessee State Route 93
 Texas State Highway 93
 Texas State Highway Loop 93 (former)
 Texas State Highway Spur 93
 Farm to Market Road 93
 Ranch to Market Road 93 (former)
 Utah State Route 93
 Virginia State Route 93
 West Virginia Route 93
 Wisconsin Highway 93
 Wyoming Highway 93

See also
A93